Garam masala is a blend of ground spices common in North Indian and other South Asian cuisines.

Garam Masala may also refer to:

 Garam Masala (1972 film), a Hindi comedy film directed by Aspi Irani
 Garam Masala (2005 film), a Hindi comedy film directed by Priyadarshan
 Masala (2013 film), working title Garam Masala, a 2013 Telugu comedy film directed by K. Vijaya Bhaskar